Sigismondo Isei (1 May 1620 – September 1670) was a Roman Catholic prelate who served as Bishop of Comacchio (1655–1670).

Biography
Sigismondo Isei was born in Cesene, Italy on 1 May 1620 and ordained a priest on 16 September 1645.
On 30 August 1655, he was appointed during the papacy of Pope Alexander VII as Bishop of Comacchio.
On 12 September 1655, he was consecrated bishop by Giovanni Battista Maria Pallotta, Cardinal-Priest of San Pietro in Vincoli, Patrizio Donati, Bishop Emeritus of Minori, Taddeo Altini, Bishop of Civita Castellana e Orte, serving as co-consecrators. 
He served as Bishop of Comacchio until his death in September 1670.

References

External links and additional sources
 (for Chronology of Bishops) 
 (for Chronology of Bishops) 

17th-century Italian Roman Catholic bishops
Bishops appointed by Pope Alexander VII
People from Cesena
1620 births
1670 deaths